Rhoda Mulaudzi (born 2 December 1989) is a South African soccer player who plays as a forward for Belarusian club FC Dinamo Minsk and the South Africa women's national team.

Club career
On 20 August 2018, Canberra United announced they had signed Mulaudzi for the 2018–19 W-League Season. She joined the club alongside fellow South African Refiloe Jane; they are the first players from South Africa to play in the W-League.

International career
Mulaudzi made her senior debut for South Africa during the 2015 African Games on 7 September that year in a 1–1 draw against Cameroon.

References

1989 births
Living people
South African Venda people
Sportspeople from Soweto
South African women's soccer players
Women's association football forwards
Mamelodi Sundowns F.C. players
A-League Women players
Canberra United FC players
South Africa women's international soccer players
Footballers at the 2012 Summer Olympics
Footballers at the 2016 Summer Olympics
Olympic soccer players of South Africa
South African expatriate soccer players
South African expatriate sportspeople in Australia
Expatriate women's soccer players in Australia
2019 FIFA Women's World Cup players
Apollon Ladies F.C. players